Matthew Taylor (born 6 December, 1964) is an English composer and conductor.

Biography
Taylor was born in London and attended the Junior Royal Academy of Music. He first studied composition with Robin Holloway at Queens' College, Cambridge University and later at Guildhall School of Music and Drama and at the Royal Academy of Music. He later continued his composition training with Robert Simpson and Sir Malcolm Arnold. As a conductor he trained with Robin Page, Vilém Tauský, and with Leonard Bernstein at the Schleswig-Holstein Musik festival.

Taylor appeared as Guest Conductor with the English Chamber Orchestra, Bournemouth Symphony Orchestra, City of London Sinfonia, Royal Ballet Sinfonia, European Community Chamber Orchestra and St Petersburg State Academic Orchestra and has recorded for Hyperion Records and Dutton. Matthew Taylor has conducted first performances of pieces by Robert Simpson, Vagn Holmboe, David Matthews and James Francis Brown.

Taylor's compositions, which include six symphonies, eight string quartets and a considerable body of other chamber music, have been performed by the BBC Symphony Orchestra, BBC Scottish Symphony Orchestra, John McCabe, Martyn Brabbins, George Hurst, Richard Watkins, Raphael Wallfisch and Kenneth Woods. He has been Artistic Director of the Malvern Festival, Composer in Residence at the Blackheath Halls, Associate Composer of ensemble Sound Collective, Artistic Director of the Royal Tunbridge Wells International Music Festival and Artistic Director of the St Petersburg British Music Festival.

Taylor was a lecturer in composition at the Royal Academy of Music and currently teaches composition at the Junior Academy.

Selected compositions
Matthew Taylor's works are published by Edition Peters.

Orchestral
 Symphony no.1 Sinfonia Brevis, op. 2 (1985)
 Lento for string orchestra, Op. 3 (1988, revised 1992)
 In Spring, Op. 4 (1989)
 Symphony No. 2, Op. 10 (1991, revised 1997 and 2008)
 Adagio for string orchestra (1998)
 The Needles, Op. 26 (2000)
 Symphony No. 3, Op. 33 (2004)
 Romanza for string orchestra, op. 36b (2006)
 Storr, Op. 43 (2011)
 Symphony No. 4, Op.54 (2015-16)
 Lovely Joan, Op.57 for string orchestra (2018)
 Symphony No. 5, Op.59 (2017-19)
 Symphony No. 6 (2021)

Band
 Blasket Dances for symphonic wind ensemble, Op. 24 (2001)

Concertante
 Piano Concerto, Op. 13 (1992)
 Clarinet Concerto, Op. 20 (1996)
 Horn Concerto, Op. 23 (1999, revised 2004)
 Double Bass Concerto, Op. 31 (2003)
 Viola Concerto "Humoreskes", Op. 41 (2010)

Chamber music
 String Quartet No.1, Op.1 (1984)
 Three Humoreskes for clarinet and piano, Op.5 (1989)
 Introduction and Capriccio for wind octet (2 oboes, 2clarinets, 2 bassoons, 2 horns), Op.7 (1990)
 String Quartet No.2, Op.8 (1990)
 Prelude, Meditation and Toccata for marimba (1991)
 Violin Sonata, Op.12 (1992, revised 1994)
 A July Pastoral for horn solo (1992) or for English horn (1993)
 Night Visions for clarinet, violin, cello and piano, Op.14 (1993)
 The Third Vision for oboe, horn, violin, cello and piano, Op.14 No.3a (1997)
 Images in Spring for flute (piccolo) and piano, Op.16 (1993)
 Piano Trio, Op.17 (1994)
 A June Cantilena for clarinet solo (1995)
 String Quartet No.3, Op.18 (1995)
 Conflict and Consolation for 4 horns, 3 trumpets, 3 trombones, tuba, timpani and percussion, Op.19 (1996)
 Romanza for cello and piano (1997)
 Trio – In Memoriam V.H. for flute (alto flute), viola and cello, Op.21 (1997)
 String Quartet No.4, Op.22 (1999)
 Four Lullabies for violin, viola, cello and piano, Op.27 (2001)
 Adagio – Tribute to R.S. for string quartet, Op.28 (1998)
 Cello Sonata, Op.29 (2002)
 Fantasy Pieces for cello (or viola) and piano, Op.30 (2002)
 Pastorals for violin and piano, Op.32 (2003)
 Skal for wind quintet (2004)
 Serenata Trionfale for wind octet (2 oboes, 2clarinets, 2 bassoons, 2 horns), Op.34 (2006)
 String Quartet No.5, Op.35 (2007)
 String Quartet No.6, Op.36 (2008)
 String Quartet No.7, Op.37 (2009)
 Trombone Quartet, Op.38 (2009)
 String Quartet No 8, Salutations and Celebrations, Op.56 (2017)
 Reflections for violin and piano, Op.58 (2019)

Piano
 Anniversaries and Intermezzos (1990–1998, revised 1999)
 Four Bagatellas, Op.6 (1989)
 Wassail for 4-hands, Op.15 (1993)

Vocal
 Three Rupert Brooke Songs for mezzo-soprano and piano or orchestra (1995)
 A Christmas Blessing for mixed chorus (1998)
 Four Pope Epigrams for soprano, counter-tenor, cello and harpsichord, Op.25 (1999)
 Bright is the Ring of Words for high voice and piano (2001)

References

External links 
 

1964 births
Living people
Academics of the Royal Academy of Music
Alumni of the Royal Academy of Music
Alumni of Queens' College, Cambridge
Alumni of the Guildhall School of Music and Drama
English conductors (music)
British male conductors (music)
English composers
21st-century British conductors (music)
21st-century British male musicians